Events in the year 1975 in Belgium.

Incumbents
Monarch: Baudouin
Prime Minister: Leo Tindemans

Events
 15 February – Doel Nuclear Power Station commissioned
 30 December – Law ratifying the intended merger of municipalities passed.

Births
 15 January – Sophie Wilmès, politician
 7 April – Darya Safai, politician
 26 June – Gwendolyn Rutten, politician
 16 July – Bas Leinders, racing driver
 6 October — Dave Sinardet, political scientist
 21 December – Charles Michel, politician

Deaths
 9 March – Marie Gevers (born 1883), novelist 
 6 May – Fernand Verhaegen (born 1883), artist
 10 July – Achille Van Acker (born 1898), politician
 3 August – Karel Bossart (born 1904), engineer
 15 December – Charles Lambert Manneback (born 1894), engineer

References

 
1970s in Belgium
Belgium
Years of the 20th century in Belgium
Belgium